Music from Memory is an independent record label based in Amsterdam, founded in 2013 by Abel Nagengast, Jamie Tiller and Tako Reyenga. The label started as a reissue label, but has since then released music by contemporary artists.

The name of the label is a reference to the Vito Ricci album Music from Memory. The label has been noted for reissuing rare and obscure music that had fallen out of print.

Artists

References

External links
 
 
 

Dutch independent record labels
Reissue record labels
Record labels established in 2013